George Pennacchi is an economist currently the Bailey Memorial Chair of Finance at University of Illinois. Pennacchi received a Sc.B. degree in applied mathematics from Brown University and a Ph.D. in economics from the Massachusetts Institute of Technology.

References

Year of birth missing (living people)
Living people
University of Illinois faculty
MIT School of Humanities, Arts, and Social Sciences alumni
Brown University alumni
Financial economists